Martinenghi is an Italian surname. Notable people with the surname include:

Carlo Martinenghi (1894–1944), Italian long-distance runner
 (1930–2008), Italian film director, screenwriter, and film producer
Nicolò Martinenghi (born 1999), Italian swimmer

Italian-language surnames